Indie Director is a 2013 independent film that was directed by Bill Zebub. The movie was released to DVD on May 25, 2013, and is a pseudodocumentary of Zebub's experiences with filmmaking and his creative process.

Synopsis
Bill (Bill Zebub) is a struggling independent filmmaker who wants to create movies by his own rules. He has nothing but disdain for people who compromise their own values in order to succeed and vows never to fall into the trap that has lured other directors away from their own creative visions. However, when one of Bill's films becomes wildly popular in the porn industry- despite Bill never intending it to be seen as such- he finds himself preparing another movie in order to take advantage of his newfound success, essentially compromising his own strict standards.

Cast
Bill Zebub as Bill
Angelina Leigh as Angela
Stephanie Anders as Jessica
Clover St. Claire as Svetlana
Sheri Medulla as Olga
Terra Incognita as Marissa
Tiffany Loretta Carroll as Chrystal
Donna Sheridan as Dave's Wife
Ellie Church as Joyce Heckel
Scarlett Storm as Giggling Actress
Valerie Barattucci as Melanie
Jeremiah Shaffer as Fan of toe tag
Mike O'Mahony as Mike
Steve Nebesni as Steve
Adam P. Murphy as Belladonna

Reception
Critical reception for Indie Director has been mostly positive. Fangoria and Ain't It Cool News both praised the film for its offbeat nature and sense of humor and Fangoria's Chris Alexander commented that the movie would not appeal to all audiences. Film Threat gave a mostly positive review as they felt that it "may not be great, but by God, it’s true, it’s insightful, and it’s fun." In contrast, DVD Talk panned the film overall and stated that although the movie did have some elements that "could have made for something interesting", it was "pretty painful to sit through" and it could have been improved with more editing.

References

External links
 
 

2013 films
American documentary films
2010s English-language films
2010s American films